Frankie and Johnny Are Married is a 2003 American comedy film written and directed by Michael Pressman, starring Pressman, Lisa Chess and Alan Rosenberg. The film chronicles the troubles a producer has trying to mount a production of the Terrence McNally play Frankie and Johnny in the Clair de Lune. The production is beset by one problem after another, including a hard to handle male lead (Rosenberg). This eventually results in Pressman taking on the male lead role himself.

Cast
 Michael Pressman as Michael Pressman
 Lisa Chess as Lisa Chess
 Alan Rosenberg as Alan Rosenberg
 Stephen Tobolowsky as Murray Mintz
 Jillian Armenante as Cynthia
 Morgan Nagler as Sally
 Maury Sterling as Roger
 Hector Elizondo as Hector Elizondo
 Jerry Levine as Jerry Levine
 Alice West as Alice West
 Jeffrey Passero as Jeffrey Passero
 Mandy Patinkin as Mandy Patinkin
 Brooks Pressman as Brooks Pressman
 David E. Kelley as David E. Kelley
 Les Moonves as Les Moonves
 Nina Tassler as Nina Tassler
 Barry Primus as Barry Primus
 Kathy Baker as Kathy Baker
 Steven Glick as Steven Glick
 Lou Antonio as Lou Antonio

References

External links
 
 
 

2003 films
2003 comedy films
American comedy films
2000s English-language films
Comedy films based on actual events
American independent films
American mockumentary films
Films directed by Michael Pressman
2000s American films